Carlo Burton (aka Charles Evans Jr.) is a film producer, director, actor, screenwriter, and cinematographer.  He is a member of the Screen Actors Guild, the Directors Guild of America and a signatory producer at both Guilds.

Some Film Contributions
In 1992, Carlo Burton aka Charles Evans Jr. DGA/SAG  bought the rights to the life story of "Glasnost Gangster" Andrey Kuznetzov  who was murdered eight months earlier in Los Angeles . Subsequently, Charles Evans Jr. was repped by ICM from April 22, 1992 to April 22, 1994 in a one project producer/writer deal concerning the life of Andrey Kuznetsov and "the infiltration by ex-KGB'ers into the U.S. mob scene. " 

Carlo Burton aka Charles Evans Jr. DGA/SAG  directed and financed a film called "Portrait of Eve" written by Arthur V. Lowen.

Carlo Burton aka Charles Evans Jr. DGA/SAG  also produced a film called "The Trophy", Acting by Elie Travis of "Dead Air".

Carlo Burton aka Charles Evans Jr. DGA/SAG  also produces/directs documentaries. Featured in the New Mexico Film Festival,  "Space Travelers" "focuses on legendary aerospace pioneer and designer Burt Rutan as he tries to take space flight into the next generation. George Takei from the original "Star Trek" series narrates."

Film History

Producer
2018 Carlo Burton on the Ancient Roman Road to Switzerland (documentary) (Producer)
2016 Nobel Prize Winner Roger Guillemin (documentary) (Producer)
2016 Nobel Prize Winner Kary Mullis (documentary) (producer)
2015 Nobel Prize Winner Sherwood Rowland (documentary) (producer)
2013 Romains (documentary) (producer)
2012 Underground (documentary) (producer)
2012 Samba Parade in Humboldt CO (documentary) (producer)
2010 Chaos to Harmony (documentary) (executive producer, producer)
2010 Virgin Sex Myth: False and Disastrous Cure of AIDS (documentary) (producer)
2008 "South Africa, Aids, Rape and Women's Rights (documentary) (executive producer, producer)
2009 Science + Dharma = Social Responsibility (documentary) (executive producer, producer) 

2009 Space Travelers (documentary) (executive producer, producer)

2007 The Trophy (producer)  
2006 Look Away: A Tale from Salem (TV movie) (producer)
2005 Alex and Ro (producer) 
2005 Portrait of Eve (producer) 
1993 Sandman (associate producer)

Director
2018 Carlo Burton on the Ancient Roman Road to Switzerland (documentary)
2016 Noble Prize Winner Roger Guillemin (documentary)
2016 Nobel Prize Winner Kary Mullis (documentary)
2015 Sherwood Rowland (documentary)
2013 Romains (documentary)
2012 Underground (documentary)
2012 Samba Parade in Humboldt CO (documentary)
2010 Chaos to Harmony (documentary)
2010 Virgin Sex Myth: False and Disastrous Cure of AIDS (documentary)
2010/I South Africa, Aids, Rape and Women's Rights (documentary)
2009 Science + Dharma = Social Responsibility (documentary)
2009 Space Travelers (documentary)
2007 The Trophy2005 Alex and Ro 2005 Portrait of Eve Cinematographer
2018 Carlo Burton on the Ancient Roman Road to Switzerland (documentary)
2016 Nobel Prize Winner Roger Guillemin (documentary)
2010 Chaos to Harmony (documentary)
2009 Science + Dharma = Social Responsibility (documentary)
2009 Space Travelers (documentary)
2007 The Trophy 2005 Alex and Ro 2005 Portrait of EveEditor
2018 Carlo Burton on the Ancient Roman Road to Switzerland (documentary)
2010 Virgin Sex Myth: False and Disastrous Cure of AIDS (documentary)
2009 Science + Dharma = Social Responsibility (documentary)
2009 Space Travelers (documentary)
2005 Alex and Ro Actor
2007 The Trophy —Arthur
2005 Alex and Ro—Alex
2005 Portrait of Eve —Anthony
1994 Harts of the West (TV series) – Drive, He Said (1994) … Gambler

Writer
2009 Science + Dharma = Social Responsibility (documentary) (writer)
2009 Space Travelers (documentary) (written by)
2005 Portrait of Eve Casting Director
2005 Portrait of Eve''

References

External links
Charles Evans' Official Website
Charles Evans at The Directors Guild of America

Charles Evans on Facebook

Year of birth missing (living people)
Living people
American filmmakers